The 15th Houston Film Critics Society Awards were announced on January 19, 2022, at the Museum of Fine Arts, Houston (MFAH) in Texas. The nominations were announced on January 3, 2022, with The Power of the Dog leading the nominations with nine.

The nominees for the Texas Independent Film Award were announced on December 3, 2021.

Winners and nominees

Winners are listed first and highlighted with boldface.

References

External links
 Official website

2022 in Texas
2021 film awards
2021
Houston